Go This Way is the second full-length album by punk rock band Bomb Factory.  It was released in January 2002 on Monstar Records/Hell Hornet Records, and contains 15 songs. Track 8 appears on Tecmo's Super Shot Soccer soundtrack for PlayStation.

Track listing

References

External links
Bomb Factory's official website

Bomb Factory (band) albums
2002 albums